Sandra Dale Dennis (April 27, 1937 – March 2, 1992) was an American actress. She made her film debut in the drama Splendor in the Grass (1961). For her performance in the comedy-drama film Who's Afraid of Virginia Woolf? (1966), she received the Academy Award for Best Supporting Actress.

Dennis appeared in the films The Three Sisters (1966), Up the Down Staircase (1967), That Cold Day in the Park (1969), The Out-of-Towners (1970), God Told Me To (1976), The Four Seasons (1981), Come Back to the Five and Dime, Jimmy Dean, Jimmy Dean (1982), and Another Woman (1988). Her final film appearance came in the crime drama film The Indian Runner (1991).

Dennis had a successful career on stage, appearing in the original stage production of Come Back to the Five and Dime, Jimmy Dean, Jimmy Dean. For her performance in the play A Thousand Clowns, she received the Tony Award for Best Featured Actress in a Play. For her performance in the play Any Wednesday, she received the Tony Award for Best Actress in a Play.

Dennis was a renowned animal activist. She rescued stray cats from the bowels of Grand Central Terminal. At the time of her death in Westport, Connecticut, she lived with more than 20 cats, who were adopted out by longtime friends to new homes.

Early life
Dennis was born in Hastings, Nebraska, the daughter of Yvonne (née Hudson), a secretary, and Jack Dennis, a postal clerk. Her parents divorced in 1967, after 39 years of marriage. She had an elder brother, Frank. Dennis grew up in Kenesaw, Nebraska, and Lincoln, Nebraska, graduating from Lincoln High School in 1955; one of her classmates was writer and comedian Dick Cavett. She attended Nebraska Wesleyan University and the University of Nebraska, appearing in the Lincoln Community Theater Group before moving to New York City at age 19. She studied acting at HB Studio in New York City.

Career

Early career
Dennis made her television debut in 1956 in the soap opera The Guiding Light.

She had an early break when cast as an understudy in the Broadway production of William Inge's The Dark at the Top of the Stairs (1957) directed by Elia Kazan. Kazan cast Dennis in her first feature film, a small part in Splendor in the Grass (1961), which starred Natalie Wood and Warren Beatty.

Dennis was cast in Face of a Hero (1960) on Broadway alongside Jack Lemmon. The play had only a short run, but Dennis received good notices. The Complaisant Lover (1961–62) by Graham Greene was more successful, running for 101 performances; Michael Redgrave and Googie Withers were also in the cast.

Broadway stardom
Dennis achieved Broadway fame with her leading role in Herb Gardner's A Thousand Clowns (1962–63), for which she won a Tony award for her performance alongside Jason Robards. The show ran for 428 performances.

Around this time, Dennis guest-starred on episodes of the TV series Naked City ("Idylls of a Running Back", 1962, "Carrier", 1963), The Fugitive ("The Other Side of the Mountain", 1963), Arrest and Trial ("Somewhat Lower Than the Angels" 1964), and Mr. Broadway ("Don't Mention My Name in Sheboygan", 1964). She was the lead of the Broadway comedy Any Wednesday (1964–66), which ran for 983 performances and won her a second Tony.

Film stardom
Dennis's second film role was as Honey, the fragile, neurotic young wife of George Segal's character, in Who's Afraid of Virginia Woolf? (1966). Directed by Mike Nichols and starring Elizabeth Taylor and Richard Burton, the film was a huge critical and commercial success and Dennis won the Oscar for Best Supporting Actress for her role.

Dennis returned to the stage in a production of The Three Sisters (1966) with Geraldine Page and Kim Stanley that went to London and was filmed.

Dennis's first lead role in a movie was in Up the Down Staircase (1967), directed by Robert Mulligan. In his review for The New York Times, Bosley Crowther cited her for "a vivid performance of emotional range and depth … engagingly natural, sensitive, literate and thoroughly moving." The film was a box-office success, as was The Fox (1967), directed by Mark Rydell, despite its controversial subject matter. In 1967 Dennis was voted the 18th biggest star in the US.

Dennis briefly returned to Broadway to star in Daphne in Cottage D (1967), which had a short run.

She starred in Sweet November (1968) as a terminally ill woman who takes multiple lovers, and made a TV version of the play A Hatful of Rain (1968).

Dennis went to London to star in A Touch of Love (1969), which flopped at the box office, as did That Cold Day in the Park (1969), despite being directed by Robert Altman. The Out-of-Towners (1970), a Neil Simon comedy with Jack Lemmon, was a hit.

Television and supporting roles
Dennis made a TV movie with Stuart Whitman, Only Way Out Is Dead (1970). She returned to Broadway for How the Other Half Loves (1971) by Alan Ayckbourn, which ran for over 100 performances, then did another TV movie Something Evil (1972), directed by Steven Spielberg, which drew a mixed reception.

Let Me Hear You Smile (1973) on Broadway only lasted one performance, but Absurd Person Singular (1974–76) was a big hit, running 591 performances.

In 1974 she played Joan of Arc in the pilot of Witness to Yesterday, Patrick Watson's series of interviews with great figures out of the past.

Dennis was in Mr. Sycamore (1975) with Jason Robards and had a small role in the low-budget horror film God Told Me To (1976) by Larry Cohen. Her performance in the British comedy Nasty Habits (1977) drew harsh criticism from Vincent Canby in the New York Times.

Dennis guest starred in Police Story ("Day of Terror... Night of Fear", 1978), and starred in the TV movies Perfect Gentlemen (1979) (written by Nora Ephron), and Wilson's Reward (1981). On Broadway she briefly joined the cast of the long-running Same Time, Next Year.

She had a well-received part in Alan Alda's The Four Seasons (1981) and was in The Supporting Cast (1981) on Broadway for Gene Saks. She was in the stage production and film version of Robert Altman's Come Back to the Five and Dime, Jimmy Dean, Jimmy Dean (1982).

Later career
In the mid- and late 1980s, Dennis acted less, owing to growing health problems. She appeared on TV in Young People's Specials ("The Trouble with Mother", 1985), The Love Boat ("Roommates/Heartbreaker/Out of the Blue", 1985), Alfred Hitchcock Presents ("Arthur, or the Gigolo", 1985) and The Equalizer ("Out of the Past", 1986). In motion pictures, she had supporting roles in a 1986 remake of Laughter in the Dark, which was never completed, Woody Allen's Another Woman (1988), and the horror films 976-EVIL (1989) and Parents (1989).

Her final role was in the crime drama The Indian Runner, filmed in 1990 and released in 1991. The movie marked Sean Penn's debut as a film director. Actor Viggo Mortensen, who played one of her two sons, wrote of the preparations for the movie and filming in the vicinity of Omaha, Nebraska:

Death
Dennis died from ovarian cancer on March 2, 1992, at her home in Westport, Connecticut, at age 54.

Personal life
Dennis lived with prominent jazz musician Gerry Mulligan from 1965 to 1974. In October 1965, her hometown newspaper, The Lincoln Star, published an Associated Press article stating she and Mulligan had married in Connecticut in June of that year. In a 1989 interview with People, however, Dennis admitted that they only pretended to be married after she unintentionally became pregnant. Dennis miscarried, adding, "If I'd been a mother, I would have loved the child, but I just didn't have any connection with it when I was pregnant ... I never, ever wanted children. It would have been like having an elephant."

From 1980 to 1985, Dennis lived with actor Eric Roberts. On June 4, 1981, her German Shepherd was riding with Roberts when he crashed his vehicle into a tree. Roberts, who was under the influence of cocaine at the time, fell in a coma for 72 hours and had to withdraw from the Broadway show Mass Appeal. Dennis's dog survived the accident. She and Roberts were engaged to be married in spring 1983, but the ceremony never took place.

Dennis's sexual orientation was subjected to public discussion as early as 1968, when the scandal magazine Uncensored ran a story that labeled her a lesbian. In an article published more than 20 years after Dennis' death, Eric Roberts identified her as bisexual. According to Roberts, Dennis told him she had many lesbian relationships and that she "appreciated the beauty of women. But she also liked and appreciated what a very, very young man could do to a woman, I suppose."

During Dennis's lifetime, in-depth published interviews with her, such as one with The Christian Science Monitor during her stint performing in an ensemble cast at the John F. Kennedy Center for the Performing Arts in 1981, made no mention of close relationships with women. That interview included the following exchange about her marital status:

Filmography

Film

Television

Theater

References

External links
Internet Broadway Database
 

  Sandy Dennis, Veteran Actress And Prize Winner, Is Dead at 54, New York Times, 5 March 1992

1937 births
1992 deaths
20th-century American actresses
Actresses from Nebraska
American film actresses
American stage actresses
American television actresses
Best Supporting Actress Academy Award winners
Deaths from cancer in Connecticut
Deaths from ovarian cancer
LGBT actresses
LGBT people from Nebraska
People from Hastings, Nebraska
People from Westport, Connecticut
Tony Award winners
Actors from Lincoln, Nebraska
20th-century American LGBT people
Bisexual actresses
American bisexual actors